Diop, uncommonly spelled Dioup, is a popular Wolof surname in Senegal and Gambia (where it is commonly written "Jobe"), and may refer to:

 Aïda Diop (born 1970), Senegalese sprinter
 Alice Diop (born 1979), French filmmaker
 Aminata Diop (born circa 1968), Malian woman who fled to France to escape a female genital mutilation procedure
 Binta Zahra Diop (born 1990), Senegalese swimmer
 Birago Diop (1906–1989), Senegalese poet and diplomat
 Boubacar Boris Diop (born 1946), Senegalese writer and journalist
 Cheikh Anta Diop (1923–1986), Senegalese historian, anthropologist, physicist and politician
 David Diop (1927–1960), poet
 David Diop (born 1966), French novelist
 DeSagana Diop (born 1982), Senegalese basketballer
 Djibril Diop Mambéty (1945–1998), Senegalese film director
 Issa Diop (disambiguation), several people
 Khoudia Diop (born 1996), Senegalese fashion model
 Lat Dior Ngoné Latyr Diop (1842–1886), Senegalese king of Cayor
 Mamadou Diop (disambiguation), several people
 Mustapha Papa Diop (born 1987), Senegalese footballer
 Ndèye Tické Ndiaye Diop, Senegalese politician
 Papa Bouba Diop (1978–2020), Senegalese footballer
 Papa Kouli Diop (born 1986), Senegalese footballer
 Papa Malick Diop (born 1974), Senegalese footballer
 Pape Seydou Diop (born 1979), Senegalese footballer
 Pape Diop (born 1954), Senegalese politician
 Wasis Diop (born 1950), Senegalese musician
 Fatou Dioup (born 1994), Mauritanian footballer

DIOP is an acronym.
 DIOP stands for the organophosphorus compound 2,3-O-isopropylidene-2,3-dihydroxy-1,4-bis(diphenylphosphino)butane

See also
 

Senegalese surnames